Brüssow is a town in the Uckermark district, in Brandenburg, Germany. It is situated 16 km southeast of Pasewalk, and 27 km west of Szczecin.

Demography

References

Localities in Uckermark (district)